Daniel Chan Ho Yuen (born 17 January 1985) is a Hong Kong para-badminton player who won bronze at the 2020 Summer Paralympics. He lost his leg in a car accident in 2008. He began representing Hong Kong in international competitions since 2010. He won silver in the WH2 class at the 2018 Asian Para Games. His main rival is said to be Kim Jung-jun.

Achievements

Paralympic Games 
Men's singles WH2

World Championships 

Men's singles

Men's doubles

Asian Para Games 

Men's singles

Asian Championships 
Men's singles

Men's doubles

BWF Para Badminton World Circuit (2 runners-up) 
The BWF Para Badminton World Circuit – Grade 2, Level 1, 2 and 3 tournaments has been sanctioned by the Badminton World Federation from 2022.

Men's singles

International Tournaments (18 titles, 16 runners-up) 
Men's singles

Men's doubles

Mixed doubles

References 

1985 births
Living people
Paralympic badminton players of Hong Kong
Badminton players at the 2020 Summer Paralympics
Paralympic medalists in badminton
Medalists at the 2020 Summer Paralympics
Paralympic bronze medalists for Hong Kong
Hong Kong male badminton players
Hong Kong para-badminton players